Men of Tomorrow may refer to:
 Men of Tomorrow (1932 film), a British drama film
 Men of Tomorrow (1959 film), a British short feature